Carl Friedrich Meerwein (2 August 1737 – 6 December 1810) was a German civil engineer and aviation pioneer.

Meerwein was born in Leiselheim. He built flying devices with moving wings. According to the Encyclopædia Britannica he succeeded in flying with one of these devices, an ornithopter in 1781, at Giessen, Germany. Further attempts were less successful. There is a legend that he only survived one of his flights in 1784 because he hit exactly upon a dung pile.

"Meerwein, the architect of the Prince of Baden, built an orthopteric machine, and protested against the tendency of the aerostats which had just been invented." (Verne, Robur)

Meerwein died in Emmendingen, as a result of a fall from a horse.

Notes

Sources
This article is based in part on material from the German Wikipedia.

Further reading
 "Airplane:History of Flight" (2007) Encyclopædia Britannica Retrieved May 17, 2007, from Encyclopædia Britannica
 Hart, Clive (1972)The dream of flight: aeronautics from classical times to the Renaissance Faber and Faber, London,

External links 

 Sportfliegerclub Carl Friedrich Meerwein e.V. Emmendingen
 Encyclopædia Britannica: history of transportation

Aviation inventors
Aviation pioneers
18th-century German inventors
German aviators
German civil engineers
1737 births
1810 deaths
People from Worms, Germany
Engineers from Rhineland-Palatinate